Wisconsin was admitted to the Union on May 29, 1848. Its current U.S. senators are Republican Ron Johnson (since 2011) and Democrat Tammy Baldwin (since 2013), making it one of seven states to have a split United States Senate delegation.

List of senators

|- style="height:2em"
| colspan=3 | Vacant
| nowrap | May 29, 1848 –Jun 8, 1848
| Wisconsin elected its senators 10 days after statehood.
| rowspan=3 | 1
| 
| rowspan=2 | 1
| Wisconsin elected its senators 10 days after statehood.
| nowrap | May 29, 1848 –Jun 8, 1848
| colspan=3 | Vacant

|- style="height:2em"
! rowspan=5 | 1
| rowspan=5 align=left | Henry Dodge
| rowspan=5  | Democratic
| rowspan=5 nowrap | Jun 8, 1848 –Mar 3, 1857
| rowspan=2 | Elected in 1848.
| Elected in 1848.
| rowspan=4 nowrap | Jun 8, 1848 –Mar 3, 1855
| rowspan=4  | Democratic
| rowspan=4 align=right | Isaac P. Walker
! rowspan=4 | 1

|- style="height:2em"
| 
| rowspan=3 | 2
| rowspan=3 | Re-elected in 1849.Retired.

|- style="height:2em"
| rowspan=3 | Re-elected in 1851.Retired.
| rowspan=3 | 2
| 

|- style="height:2em"
| 

|- style="height:2em"
| 
| rowspan=3 | 3
| rowspan=3 | Elected in 1854.Retired.
| rowspan=3 nowrap | Mar 4, 1855 –Mar 3, 1861
| rowspan=3  | Republican
| rowspan=3 align=right | Charles Durkee
! rowspan=3 | 2

|- style="height:2em"
! rowspan=6 | 2
| rowspan=6 align=left | James Rood Doolittle
| rowspan=6  | Republican
| rowspan=6 nowrap | Mar 4, 1857 –Mar 3, 1869
| rowspan=3 | Elected in 1857.
| rowspan=3 | 3
| 

|- style="height:2em"
| 

|- style="height:2em"
| 
| rowspan=3 | 4
| rowspan=3 | Elected in 1861.
| rowspan=9 nowrap | Mar 4, 1861 –Mar 3, 1879
| rowspan=9  | Republican
| rowspan=9 align=right | Timothy O. Howe
! rowspan=9 | 3

|- style="height:2em"
| rowspan=3 | Re-elected in 1863.Retired.
| rowspan=3 | 4
| 

|- style="height:2em"
| 

|- style="height:2em"
| 
| rowspan=3 | 5
| rowspan=3 | Re-elected in 1866.

|- style="height:2em"
! rowspan=3 | 3
| rowspan=3 align=left | Matthew H. Carpenter
| rowspan=3  | Republican
| rowspan=3 nowrap | Mar 4, 1869 –Mar 3, 1875
| rowspan=3 | Elected in 1869.Lost re-election.
| rowspan=3 | 5
| 

|- style="height:2em"
| 

|- style="height:2em"
| 
| rowspan=3 | 6
| rowspan=3 | Re-elected in 1872.Lost re-election.

|- style="height:2em"
! rowspan=4 | 4
| rowspan=4 align=left | Angus Cameron
| rowspan=4  | Republican
| rowspan=4 nowrap | Mar 4, 1875 –Mar 3, 1881
| rowspan=4 | Elected in 1875.Retired.
| rowspan=4 | 6
| 

|- style="height:2em"
| 

|- style="height:2em"
| 
| rowspan=5 | 7
| Elected in 1879.Died.
| nowrap | Mar 4, 1879 –Feb 24, 1881
|  | Republican
| align=right | Matthew H. Carpenter
! 4

|- style="height:2em"
| rowspan=2 |  
| rowspan=2 nowrap | Feb 24, 1881 –Mar 14, 1881
| rowspan=2 colspan=3 | Vacant

|- style="height:2em"
! rowspan=7 | 5
| rowspan=7 align=left | Philetus Sawyer
| rowspan=7  | Republican
| rowspan=7 nowrap | Mar 4, 1881 –Mar 3, 1893
| rowspan=4 | Elected in 1881.
| rowspan=4 | 7
| 

|- style="height:2em"
| rowspan=2 | Elected to finish Carpenter's term.Retired.
| rowspan=2 nowrap | Mar 14, 1881 –Mar 3, 1885
| rowspan=2  | Republican
| rowspan=2 align=right | Angus Cameron
! rowspan=2 | 5

|- style="height:2em"
| 

|- style="height:2em"
| 
| rowspan=3 | 8
| rowspan=3 | Elected in 1885.Lost re-election.
| rowspan=3 nowrap | Mar 4, 1885 –Mar 3, 1891
| rowspan=3  | Republican
| rowspan=3 align=right | John Coit Spooner
! rowspan=3 | 6

|- style="height:2em"
| rowspan=3 | Re-elected in 1887.Retired.
| rowspan=3 | 8
| 

|- style="height:2em"
| 

|- style="height:2em"
| 
| rowspan=3 | 9
| rowspan=3 | Elected in 1891.Lost renomination.
| rowspan=3 nowrap | Mar 4, 1891 –Mar 3, 1897
| rowspan=3  | Democratic
| rowspan=3 align=right | William F. Vilas
! rowspan=3 | 7

|- style="height:2em"
! rowspan=3 | 6
| rowspan=3 align=left | John L. Mitchell
| rowspan=3  | Democratic
| rowspan=3 nowrap | Mar 4, 1893 –Mar 3, 1899
| rowspan=3 | Elected in 1893.Retired.
| rowspan=3 | 9
| 

|- style="height:2em"
| 

|- style="height:2em"
| 
| rowspan=3 | 10
| rowspan=3 | Elected in 1897.
| rowspan=6 nowrap | Mar 4, 1897 –Apr 30, 1907
| rowspan=6  | Republican
| rowspan=6 align=right | John Coit Spooner
! rowspan=6 | 8

|- style="height:2em"
! rowspan=3 | 7
| rowspan=3 align=left | Joseph V. Quarles
| rowspan=3  | Republican
| rowspan=3 nowrap | Mar 4, 1899 –Mar 3, 1905
| rowspan=3 | Elected in 1899.Retired.
| rowspan=3 | 10
| 

|- style="height:2em"
| 

|- style="height:2em"
| 
| rowspan=5 | 11
| rowspan=3 | Re-elected in 1903.Resigned.

|- style="height:2em"
! rowspan=15 | 8
| rowspan=15 align=left | Robert M. La Follette
| rowspan=15  | Republican
| rowspan=15 nowrap | Jan 4, 1906 –Jun 18, 1925
| rowspan=5 | Elected in 1905.Did not assume office until Jan 2, 1906 to finish his term as Governor of Wisconsin.
| rowspan=5 | 11
| 

|- style="height:2em"
| 

|- style="height:2em"
|  
| nowrap | Apr 30, 1907 –May 17, 1907
| colspan=3 | Vacant

|- style="height:2em"
| Elected to finish Spooner's term.
| rowspan=4 nowrap | May 17, 1907 –Mar 3, 1915
| rowspan=4  | Republican
| rowspan=4 align=right | Isaac Stephenson
! rowspan=4 | 9

|- style="height:2em"
| 
| rowspan=3 | 12
| rowspan=3 | Re-elected in 1909.Retired.

|- style="height:2em"
| rowspan=3 | Re-elected in 1911.
| rowspan=3 | 12
| 

|- style="height:2em"
| 

|- style="height:2em"
| 
| rowspan=5 | 13
| rowspan=2 | Elected in 1914.Died.
| rowspan=2 nowrap | Mar 4, 1915 –Oct 21, 1917
| rowspan=2  | Democratic
| rowspan=2 align=right | Paul O. Husting
! rowspan=2 | 10

|- style="height:2em"
| rowspan=5 | Re-elected in 1916.
| rowspan=5 | 13
| 

|- style="height:2em"
|  
| nowrap | Oct 21, 1917 –Apr 18, 1918
| colspan=3 | Vacant

|- style="height:2em"
| rowspan=2 | Elected in 1918 to finish Husting's term.
| rowspan=7 nowrap | Apr 18, 1918 –Mar 3, 1927
| rowspan=7  | Republican
| rowspan=7 align=right | Irvine Lenroot
! rowspan=7 | 11

|- style="height:2em"
| 

|- style="height:2em"
| 
| rowspan=5 | 14
| rowspan=5 | Re-elected in 1920.Lost renomination.

|- style="height:2em"
| rowspan=2 | Re-elected in 1922.Died.
| rowspan=5 | 14
| 

|- style="height:2em"
| 

|- style="height:2em"
| colspan=3 | Vacant
| nowrap | Jun 18, 1925 –Sep 30, 1925
|  

|- style="height:2em"
! rowspan=11 | 9
| rowspan=11 align=left | Robert M. La Follette Jr.
| rowspan=5  | Republican
| rowspan=11 nowrap | Sep 30, 1925 –Jan 3, 1947
| rowspan=2 | Elected to finish his father's term

|- style="height:2em"
| 
| rowspan=3 | 15
| rowspan=3 | Elected in 1926.Lost renomination.
| rowspan=3 nowrap | Mar 4, 1927 –Mar 3, 1933
| rowspan=3  | Republican
| rowspan=3 align=right | John J. Blaine
! rowspan=3 | 12

|- style="height:2em"
| rowspan=3 | Re-elected in 1928.
| rowspan=3 | 15
| 

|- style="height:2em"
| 

|- style="height:2em"
| 
| rowspan=3 | 16
| rowspan=3 | Elected in 1932.Lost re-election.
| rowspan=3 nowrap | Mar 4, 1933 –Jan 3, 1939
| rowspan=3  | Democratic
| rowspan=3 align=right | F. Ryan Duffy
! rowspan=3 | 13

|- style="height:2em"
| rowspan=6  | Progressive
| rowspan=3 | Re-elected in 1934.
| rowspan=3 | 16
| 

|- style="height:2em"
| 

|- style="height:2em"
| 
| rowspan=3 | 17
| rowspan=3 | Elected in 1938.
| rowspan=14 nowrap | Jan 3, 1939 –Jan 3, 1963
| rowspan=14  | Republican
| rowspan=14 align=right | Alexander Wiley
! rowspan=14 | 14

|- style="height:2em"
| rowspan=3 | Re-elected in 1940.Lost nomination as a Republican.
| rowspan=3 | 17
| 

|- style="height:2em"
| 

|- style="height:2em"
| 
| rowspan=3 | 18
| rowspan=3 | Re-elected in 1944.

|- style="height:2em"
! rowspan=6 | 10
| rowspan=6 align=left | Joseph McCarthy
| rowspan=6  | Republican
| rowspan=6 nowrap | Jan 3, 1947 –May 2, 1957
| rowspan=3 | Elected in 1946.
| rowspan=3 | 18
| 

|- style="height:2em"
| 

|- style="height:2em"
| 
| rowspan=3 | 19
| rowspan=3 | Re-elected in 1950.

|- style="height:2em"
| rowspan=3 | Re-elected in 1952.Died.
| rowspan=5 | 19
| 

|- style="height:2em"
| 

|- style="height:2em"
| 
| rowspan=5 | 20
| rowspan=5 | Re-elected in 1956.Lost re-election.

|- style="height:2em"
| colspan=3 | Vacant
| nowrap | May 3, 1957 –Aug 27, 1957
|  

|- style="height:2em"
! rowspan=16 | 11
| rowspan=16 align=left | William Proxmire
| rowspan=16  | Democratic
| rowspan=16 nowrap | Aug 28, 1957 –Jan 3, 1989
| Elected to finish McCarthy's term

|- style="height:2em"
| rowspan=3 | Re-elected in 1958.
| rowspan=3 | 20
| 

|- style="height:2em"
| 

|- style="height:2em"
| 
| rowspan=3 | 21
| rowspan=3 | Elected in 1962.
| rowspan=9 nowrap | Jan 3, 1963 –Jan 3, 1981
| rowspan=9  | Democratic
| rowspan=9 align=right | Gaylord Nelson
! rowspan=9 | 15

|- style="height:2em"
| rowspan=3 | Re-elected in 1964.
| rowspan=3 | 21
| 

|- style="height:2em"
| 

|- style="height:2em"
| 
| rowspan=3 | 22
| rowspan=3 | Re-elected in 1968.

|- style="height:2em"
| rowspan=3 | Re-elected in 1970.
| rowspan=3 | 22
| 

|- style="height:2em"
| 

|- style="height:2em"
| 
| rowspan=3 | 23
| rowspan=3 | Re-elected in 1974.Lost re-election.

|- style="height:2em"
| rowspan=3 | Re-elected in 1976.
| rowspan=3 | 23
| 

|- style="height:2em"
| 

|- style="height:2em"
| 
| rowspan=3 | 24
| rowspan=3 | Elected in 1980.
| rowspan=6 nowrap | Jan 3, 1981 –Jan 3, 1993
| rowspan=6  | Republican
| rowspan=6 align=right | Bob Kasten
! rowspan=6 | 16

|- style="height:2em"
| rowspan=3 | Re-elected in 1982.Retired.
| rowspan=3 | 24
| 

|- style="height:2em"
| 

|- style="height:2em"
| 
| rowspan=3 | 25
| rowspan=3 | Re-elected in 1986.Lost re-election.

|- style="height:2em"
! rowspan=12 | 12
| rowspan=12 align=left | Herb Kohl
| rowspan=12  | Democratic
| rowspan=12 nowrap | Jan 3, 1989 –Jan 3, 2013
| rowspan=3 | Elected in 1988.
| rowspan=3 | 25
| 

|- style="height:2em"
| 

|- style="height:2em"
| 
| rowspan=3 | 26
| rowspan=3 | Elected in 1992.
| rowspan=9 nowrap | Jan 3, 1993 –Jan 3, 2011
| rowspan=9  | Democratic
| rowspan=9 align=right | Russ Feingold
! rowspan=9 | 17

|- style="height:2em"
| rowspan=3 | Re-elected in 1994.
| rowspan=3 | 26
| 

|- style="height:2em"
| 

|- style="height:2em"
| 
| rowspan=3 | 27
| rowspan=3 | Re-elected in 1998.

|- style="height:2em"
| rowspan=3 | Re-elected in 2000.
| rowspan=3 | 27
| 

|- style="height:2em"
| 

|- style="height:2em"
| 
| rowspan=3 | 28
| rowspan=3 | Re-elected in 2004.Lost re-election.

|- style="height:2em"
| rowspan=3 | Re-elected in 2006.Retired.
| rowspan=3 | 28
| 

|- style="height:2em"
| 

|- style="height:2em"
| 
| rowspan=3 | 29
| rowspan=3 | Elected in 2010.
| rowspan=9 nowrap | Jan 3, 2011 –Present
| rowspan=9  | Republican
| rowspan=9 align=right | Ron Johnson
! rowspan=9 | 18

|- style="height:2em"
! rowspan=6 | 13
| rowspan=6 align=left | Tammy Baldwin
| rowspan=6  | Democratic
| rowspan=6 nowrap | Jan 3, 2013 –Present
| rowspan=3 | Elected in 2012.
| rowspan=3 | 29
| 

|- style="height:2em"
| 

|- style="height:2em"
| 
| rowspan=3 | 30
| rowspan=3 | Re-elected in 2016.

|- style="height:2em"
| rowspan=3 | Re-elected in 2018.
| rowspan=3 | 30
| 

|- style="height:2em"
| 

|- style="height:2em"
| 
| rowspan=3 | 31
| rowspan=3 | Re-elected in 2022.

|- style="height:2em"
| rowspan=3 colspan=5 | To be determined in the 2024 election.
| rowspan=3| 31
| 

|- style="height:2em"
| 

|- style="height:2em"
| 
| 32
| colspan=5 | To be determined in the 2028 election.

See also

 List of United States representatives from Wisconsin
 United States congressional delegations from Wisconsin
 Elections in Wisconsin

References 

 
Senators
Wisconsin